Law of the Rio Grande is a 1931 American Western film directed by Forrest Sheldon.

Plot
Former outlaw Jim Hardy (Bob Custer) finds it hard trying to go straight.

Cast 
Bob Custer as Jim Hardy
Betty Mack as Judy Lanning
Carlton S. King as Colonel Lanning
Nelson McDowell as Wolf Hardy
Harry Todd as Cookie
Edmund Cobb as The Blanco Kid

External links 

1931 films
American black-and-white films
1931 Western (genre) films
American Western (genre) films
1930s English-language films
1930s American films